Florin Vlaicu (born 26 July 1986 in Bucharest) is a former Romanian rugby union player. He played as a fly half or centre for professional Liga Națională de Rugby club SCM Timișoara. He could also play as a fullback, thus being considered a utility back due to his versatility. He is Romania's all time leading point scorer and the most capped player.

Club career

Junior years
Vlaicu started playing rugby at RC Flamingo București, an amateur rugby club that recruited schoolboys suited for the sport. He then moved to local club RC Grivița București, where he continued his junior years.

Senior years
After finishing his junior career he joined local giants Steaua. After 8 seasons with Steaua, with a brief stint with RCM Timișoara for whom he played one single match in 2011, he was signed in early 2014 by RCJ Farul Constanța, where he played for the whole season. Beginning with 2015 a move to local team CSM Olimpia București followed. After an impressive performance at the 2015 Rugby World Cup, Vlaicu was signed by Italian club Calvisano. After just one season with the Italians, Vlaicu returned to home soil, this time joining his former team Steaua. After 2 seasons we was once again signed by CSM București who had big ambitions at that moment in establishing a powerful side in order to capture both SuperLiga and Romanian Cup trophies. In 2019 his third spell with giants Steaua begun following the dissolution of his former club, CSM.

Provincial / State sides
Vlaicu was also selected between 2005 and 2015 for the State side assembled to play in the European Cups, namely București Wolves.

International career
Vlaicu made his international debut in 2006 as a substitute against Ukraine. He played for Romania in the IRB Nations Cup and in their 2007 Rugby World Cup qualifying before appearing for them in the 2007 Rugby World Cup. He played two Tests at the World Cup as a substitute against both Scotland and the All Blacks, scoring a penalty against the latter. He also played at the 2011 Rugby World Cup and the 2015 Rugby World Cup. He reached his 100th cap on 11 March 2017 when Romania played against Belgium in Brussels.

Records
Vlaicu set a series of records during his career. He is the most-capped Romanian player at international level with 129 caps so far, as well as the all-time caps leader from what World Rugby calls an "emerging nation"—defined in men's rugby as those outside of The Rugby Championship or Six Nations Championship. As of October 2021 he was the second leading active top point scorer in international rugby, with 1024 points (6th in the all-time rankings). Florin is also the most prolific point scorer for Romania at the Rugby World Cup with 28 points scored over three tournaments. On 13 March 2021 Vlaicu surpassed the 1000 point mark, kicking three penalties to help Romania overcome Portugal in the 2021 Rugby Europe Championship.

Retirement 
Vlaicu announced his retirement from rugby at the end of 2022.

Honours

Club
Steaua București
 Liga Națională
 Champion: 2006
 Romanian Cup
 Winner (3): 2006, 2007, 2019

RCM Timișoara
 Romanian Cup
 Winner: 2011

CSM București
 Romanian Cup
 Winner: 2018

International
Romania
 Rugby Europe Championships
 Champion (3): 2004–06, 2008–10, 2016–17

See also
 List of leading rugby union test point scorers
 List of rugby union test caps leaders

References

External links

 
 
 
 
 

1986 births
Living people
Rugby union players from Bucharest
Romanian rugby union players
Romania international rugby union players
Rugby union centres
Rugby union fly-halves
Rugby union fullbacks
București Wolves players
CSA Steaua București (rugby union) players
SCM Rugby Timișoara players
RCJ Farul Constanța players
CSM București (rugby union) players
Rugby Calvisano players
Expatriate rugby union players in Italy
Romanian expatriate sportspeople in Italy
Romanian expatriate rugby union players